Stylogomphus albistylus, the eastern least clubtail, is a species of dragonfly in the family Gomphidae. It is typically found in North America, particularly in the Appalachians and eastward. It can also be found in the states of Ohio, Michigan, and Wisconsin.

The IUCN conservation status of Stylogomphus albistylus is "LC", least concern, with no immediate threat to the species' survival. The population is stable.

References

Further reading

External links

 

Gomphidae
Articles created by Qbugbot
Insects described in 1878